Carl Reinecke's Octet in B-flat major, Op. 216 is a composition for eight wind instruments composed around 1892.

Background
The exact reason for the composition of the Octet is not known, though Hoover speculates that it may have been intended for the Société de Musique de Chambre pour Instruments à Vent founded by flutist Paul Taffanel.

Instrumentation
The composition shares with the Lachner (Op. 156) and Gouvy (Op. 71) octets scoring for flute, oboe, 2 clarinets, 2 horns, and 2 bassoons.

Structure
The composition is in four movements:

Allegro moderato
Scherzo: Vivace
Adagio ma non troppo
Finale: Allegro molto e grazioso

A typical performance takes around 22 – 23 minutes.

References
Notes

Sources

External links

Compositions by Carl Reinecke
Compositions for octet
1892 compositions
Compositions in B-flat major